Atanas Kolev (born 21 December 1996), better known by his stage name Nasko, is a Bulgarian singer and basketball player from the Bulgarian city of Varna. He was a finalist in X Factor Bulgaria in 2013.

Biography

Atanas was born in Varna, Bulgaria. He started training basketball at the age of 15 in BC Cherno More (where he still plays). He studies at the High School of Mathematics "Dr. Petar Beron", Varna.

In 2013, he participated in X Factor where he finished as a runner-up. A typical way he starts his songs is with "Lay down on the floor" repeated twice followed by "Nasko e chuek" which if you really concentrate sounds like "It is Nasko, man" but due to his origin (Varna, Bulgaria) it is still debatable what he really means.
In 2018, he participated in VIP Brother Bulgaria which he won and finished in 1st place.

Discography

External links
 X Factor profile
 Official Facebook page

References

1996 births
Living people
Musicians from Varna, Bulgaria
Bulgarian men's basketball players
X Factor (Bulgarian TV series)
Sportspeople from Varna, Bulgaria